Marcela Arroyo Vergara (born 13 December 1984) is a Mexican former professional tennis player.

Tennis career
Arroyo, a right-handed player, competed on the professional tour in the early 2000s, reaching a best doubles ranking of 307 in the world.
She won four ITF doubles titles, all partnering with Melissa Torres Sandoval in 2004.

As a doubles player, she twice featured in the main draw of the Mexican Open.

Arroyo represented Mexico in a total of seven Fed Cup ties, three in 2004 and four in 2005, for a 5–3 overall win–loss record.

At the 2005 Summer Universiade in Turkey, Arroyo teamed up with Lorena Arias to win a bronze medal for Mexico in the women's doubles event.

ITF Circuit finals

Doubles (4–1)

Notes

References

External links
 
 
 

1984 births
Living people
Mexican female tennis players
Universiade medalists in tennis
Universiade bronze medalists for Mexico
Tennis players from Mexico City
Medalists at the 2005 Summer Universiade
21st-century Mexican women